Jonathan Stratton Conklin (October 18, 1770 in East Hampton, Suffolk County, New York – June 20, 1839 in East Hampton, Suffolk Co., NY) was an American politician from New York.

Life
He was the son of Nathaniel Conklin (c. 1736–1788) and Mehitable (Stratton) Conklin (c. 1740–1784). On November 13, 1799, he married Phebe P. Stratton.

He was a member of the New York State Assembly (Suffolk Co.) in 1811 and 1814.

He was a member of the New York State Senate (1st D.) from 1830 to 1834, sitting in the 53rd, 54th, 55th, 56th and 57th New York State Legislatures.

He was a delegate to the 1832 Democratic National Convention at Baltimore.

He was buried at the North End Cemetery in East Hampton.

Sources
The New York Civil List compiled by Franklin Benjamin Hough (pages 128ff, 139, 185, 189 and 267; Weed, Parsons and Co., 1858)
Jonathan S. Conklin at Long Island Surnames
Summary of the Proceedings of a Convention of Republican Delegates (Albany, 1832; pg. 3)

External links

1770 births
1839 deaths
People from East Hampton (town), New York
New York (state) state senators
New York (state) Jacksonians
19th-century American politicians
Members of the New York State Assembly